SHL may refer to:

Industry
SHL (motorcycle), a Polish motorcycle brand from 1938 to 1970
Huta Ludwików (often abbreviated SHL), a Polish manufacturer of metal parts

Sports
Supreme Hockey League
Southern Hockey League (disambiguation)
Swedish Hockey League, the highest league in Swedish ice hockey
Swiss Handball League, the two highest league in Swiss handball

Transportation
Shillong Airport, IATA code SHL, Meghalaya, India
Siu Hong stop, MTR station code SHL, Hong Kong
Southern Highlands Line, an Intercity rail service in New South Wales, Australia

Other
The x86 command for shift left
Sacred Himalayan Landscape (SHL), a conservation area located mostly in Nepal
Schmidt hammer lassen, a Danish architecture firm
Senate House Libraries, a former grouping of academic libraries in Bloomsbury, London, in existence from 2011 to 2013
Student Homophile League (SHL), former name of Columbia Queer Alliance, Columbia University, New York City, U.S.